This is a list of hereditary baronies extant, extinct, dormant, abeyant, or forfeit, in the Peerage of Great Britain.



Baronies, 1707–1801

Anne (1707–1714)

George I (1714–1727)

George II (1727–1760)

George III (1760–1800)

See also
For separate lists, see
List of Baronies in the Peerage of England
List of Lordships of Parliament (for Scotland)
List of Baronies in the Peerage of Ireland
List of hereditary Baronies in the Peerage of the United Kingdom

References

Great Britain
Lists of British nobility